Stoian Mladenov (first name more frequently transliterated as Stoyan) is a retired Bulgarian football (soccer) midfielder who played professionally in Europe and the United States.

Career
In 1993, Mladenov began his career with Lokomotiv Ruse before moving to Rakovski Ruse in 1994 and F.C. Etar in 1995.  Mladenov left Bulgaria for Malta in 1996, signing with Nadur Youngsters F.C.  He was the 1996-1997 Best Foreign Player as Nadur won the Gozo Football League First Division championship.  In 1997, Mladenov moved to the United States and joined the Long Island Rough Riders.  He played for their U-23 team that season.  He then moved to the Minnesota Thunder early in the 1998 A-League season.  He spent three seasons with the Thunder.  In 2000, he was named to the First Team All League team.  Mladenov also played part of the 1999-2000National Professional Soccer League season with the Cleveland Crunch.  On 11 June 2001, the Thunder sent Mladenov to the Rochester Rhinos as part of a three team trade which sent Andrew Restrepo from the Rhinos to the Atlanta Silverbacks and Steve Armas from the Silverbacks to the Thunder.  Mladenov played for the Rhinos through the 2003 season.  In 2001, he was again named First Team All League.  In December 2003, Mladenov signed with LASK Linz of the second division Austrian Football First League.  He returned to the Rhinos for the 2005 season.

References

External links
 StoianMladenov.com

Living people
1975 births
Bulgarian footballers
Bulgarian expatriate footballers
Bulgarian expatriate sportspeople in the United States
Cleveland Crunch players
FC Etar Veliko Tarnovo players
Expatriate footballers in Malta
Long Island Rough Riders players
Minnesota Thunder players
National Professional Soccer League (1984–2001) players
Rochester New York FC players
A-League (1995–2004) players
Association football midfielders